Age of Warriors is a South Korean historical television series. It aired on KBS1 from February 8, 2003, to August 15, 2004, every Saturday and Sunday at 21:45 (KST) for 158 episodes. The series is set during the military rule over Goryeo.

Cast

Main characters
Seo In-seok as Yi Ui-bang
Kim Heung-ki as Jeong Jung-bu
Park Yong-woo as Gyeong Dae-seung
Lee Deok-hwa as Yi Ui-min
Kim Kap-soo as Choe Chung-heon
Ryu Deok-hwan as young Choe Chung-heon

Royal household
Male member
Lee Sung-ho as King Injong, 17th monarch
Lee Dong-shin as Wang Ji-in, Injong's half brother
Lee Hwa-jin as Wang Gak-gwan, Injong's half brother
Kim Kyu-chul as King Uijong, 18th monarch
Kim Kyung-eung as Marquess Daeryeong
Kim Byung-se as King Myeongjong, 19th monarch
Lee Woo-suk as King Sinjong, 20th monarch
Jung Tae-woo as King Huijong, 21st monarch
Na Kyung-min as Marquess Deokyang
Son In-woo as Duke Changwon
Park Byung-sun as King Gangjong, 22nd monarch
Lee In as young King Gangjong (Crown Prince Wang Suk)
Oh Hyun-chul as King Gojong (Crown Prince Wang Cheol), 23rd monarch
Jung Yoon-suk as Crown Prince Wang Jeon, later the 24th monarch King Wonjong

Female member
Kim Yoon-kyung as Empress Dowager Im
Kim Bo-mi as Empress Seonpyeong
Park Eun-bin as Queen Sapyeong, Ui-bang's daughter
Chae Min-seo as Queen Seongpyeong
Jo Yang-ja as Queen Wondeok
Yoon Ji-yoo as Queen Anhye
Choi Jung-won as Queen Janggyeong
Choi Ha-na as Princess Suan, Myeongjong's second daughter
Oh Soo-min as Princess Yeonhee, Myeongjong's first daughter
Yoo Hye-jung as Lady Im, Empress Dowager Im's little sister
Lee Ja-young as Myung-Choon, Myeongjong's concubine
Go Eun-mi as Soon-Joo, Myeongjong's concubine

Palace servant
Jung Yong-sook as Court Lady Choi, Myeongjong's maid
Heo Jin as Court Lady Jo, Gongye's maid
Ahn Hae-sook as Court Lady Jang
Yoo Byung-joon as Wang Gwang-chwi, Uijong's eunuch who died during the rebellion
Yoo Byung-han as Hansuk
Lee Choon-shik as Eunuch Choi
Lee Kyung-young as Eunuch Jo, Myeongjong's eunuch

Ministers and warriors
Joo Hyo-man as Kim Boo-shik
Kim Jong-kyul as Moon Geuk-kyum
Park Young-ji as Kim Don-joong, Boo-shik's son
Heo Ki-ho as Lee Gong-seung
Shin Dong-hoon as Moon Jang-pil
Park Byung-ho as Jo Young-in
Choi Sang-hoon as Jo Choong, Young-in's son
Jung Jin-kak as Han Roi
Yoo Soon-chul as Im Jong-shik
Kim In-tae as Yoon In-chum
Yang Hyung-ho as Woo Seung-kyung
Kim Joon-mo as Yoo Eung-kyoo
Kim Sung-won as Han Moon-joon
Nam Young-jin as Wang Jun-myung
Lee Il-woong as Lee In-ro
Jung Woon-yong as Uhm Shin-yak
Jang Chil-koon as Geum Ui
Cha Kwang-soo as Lee Kyoo-bo
Maeng Ho-rim as Im Yoo
Shin Won-kyoon as Kim Koon-soo

Warriors of Uijong's era
Kim Ki-bok as Baek Im-ji
Kim Kyoo as Jung Se-yoo
Lee Gye-young as Jung Jon-shil

Rebellion people
Park Kyung-deuk as Han Sun
Kwon Hyuk-ho as Kim Bo-dang
Song Jong-won as Jang Soon-suk
Yang Jae-won as Han Un-kook
Choi Dong-joon as Jo Wi-chong
Baek Seung-woo as Jo Kyung, Wi-chong's son
Jeon Byung-ok as Kim Jon-shim
Hwang Duk-jae as Hyun Duk-soo
Lee Chi-woo as Hyun Dam-yoon, Duk-soo's father
Park Jin-sung as Mang Yi
Ham Suk-hoon as Mang So-yi
Oh Sung-yul as Lee Gwang
Lee Jae-yun as Son Chung
Yoon Seung-won as Man-jeok
Myung Ro-jin as Soon Jung
Jung Doo-hong as Mi Jo-yi
Ko Kyu-pil as Yun Bok
Han Tae-il as Hyo Sam
Won Wan-kyoo as Hyun Oh
Kang Ji-hoo as Kim Sa-mi
Kim Young-suk as Hyo Shim
Im Jung-il as Lee Bi
Bang Hyung-joo as Pae Jwa

People from Silla
Moon Hoi-won as Kim Ja-yang
Choi Dong-kyoo as a man who longing for the noble position
Lee Do-ryun as Kim In-kyum

People in Jin dynasty
Moon Hoi-won as Emperor Sejong, the 5th Emperor
Park Woong as Bo, a member of the royal family
Kim Dae-hwan as Wanyan Heng, a member of the royal family
Joo Jin-mo as Imperial Prince Wanyan Yungong
Shin Joon-young as Yayool Kyoo
Lee Hyo-jung as Suk To-heuk, Sejong's father-in-law
Park Yoo-seung as a translator
Kim Jin-oh as Sa-sin

People in Song dynasty
Lee Jung-yong as Emperor Heumjong, the last Emperor
Choi Woo-hyuk as Crown Prince Zhao Chen
Shin Goo as an old man (merchant)

People in Eastern Jin
Yoo Dong-keun as Puxian Wannu, the 1st ruler
Lee Ui-sun as General Wanyan Ziyuan

People in Mongol Empire 
Kim Myung-soo as Genghis Khan, the 1st Emperor
Kil Yong-woo as Imperial Prince Ögedei
Ji Dae-han as Imperial Prince Chagatai
Lee Gye-young as General Sallita
Kim Joo-ho as a Marshal general
Go Tae-san as Vice Marshal Poridaewan
Lee Doo-sup as Yelü Chucai
Ahn Seung-hoon as Yelü Liuge, a vassal from Khitan Liao

People in Khitan Liao
Ra Jae-woong as Yelü Sibu, the 1st monarch of Later Liao
Jin Bong-jin as Gulno, the 2nd monarch of Later Liao
Kim Kyung-ryong as Prince Geumsan, Prince of Georan and later the 3rd monarch of Later Liao
Jung Ho-keun as Hamsa, the 5th monarch of Later Liao
Jo Joo-hyun as a general
Jeon Il-bum as a military officer
Park Yoon-bae as a soldier

People in Western Xia
Jung Bo-suk as Emperor Yangjong, the 7th monarch.
Uhm Chul-ho as Lee Joon-wook

People in Khwarazmian Empire
Jo Kyung-hwan as Jalal al-Din Mangburni, the last Sultan.

Other
Park Jun-gyu as Yi Go
Lee Min-woo as Jeong Gyeon
Kim Hyung-il as Choe Chung-su
Jung Jae-gon as Choe Woo
Lee David as young Choe Woo
Choi Sung-joon as Choe Hyang
Shin Seung-joon as young Choe Hyang

Notes

Awards and nominations

External links
 

2003 South Korean television series debuts
2004 South Korean television series endings
Korean Broadcasting System television dramas
Korean-language television shows
Television series set in Goryeo
South Korean historical television series
Television series set in the 12th century
Television series set in the 13th century